Jimmy Nirlo (born 23 August 1988) is a French professional footballer who plays for Villefranche as a midfielder.

Club career
On 27 May 2021, he signed with Villefranche.

References

External links
 Jimmy Nirlo at foot-national.com
 
 

1988 births
Living people
Sportspeople from Ain
People from Oyonnax
French footballers
Association football midfielders
Jura Sud Foot players
Stade Rennais F.C. players
Veria F.C. players
Pacy Ménilles RC players
US Créteil-Lusitanos players
Football Bourg-en-Bresse Péronnas 01 players
Vendée Poiré-sur-Vie Football players
FC Villefranche Beaujolais players
Championnat National players
Ligue 2 players
French expatriate footballers
French expatriate sportspeople in Greece
Expatriate footballers in Greece
Footballers from Auvergne-Rhône-Alpes